La contemporaine is a French library, museum and archive center specialized on 20th century history. It was named "Bibliothèque de documentation internationale contemporaine" (BDIC) until 2018. The institutions has two centers, one in the Paris Nanterre University campus which hosts the archives and the library. The museum is located within the premises of  the  Hôtel National des Invalides in the 7th arrondissement of Paris.

The institution was originally established in 1914 as the Library-Museum of the War, and became part of the Ministry of Public Education in 1917. In 1925 the President of the Republic performed its inauguration within the Museum of the War in the Pavillon de la Reine at the Château de Vincennes. In 1970, the archives and the library were moved to the Paris Nanterre University campus while the museum has been hosted within Les Invalides since 1973.

Today the museum contains about 1,500,000 items and documents from 1870 to the present day, covering major themes of French or international history. Collections focus on political, social and cultural concerns, and represent multiple media including paintings, sculptures, objects, engravings, drawings, posters, photos, and postcards. It presents major temporary exhibits in addition to items from its permanent collection. The library has a collection of 40,000 different journals and newspapers titles as well as 800,000 monographies.

See also 
 List of museums in Paris

References

External links

Museums in Paris
History museums in France
Buildings and structures in the 7th arrondissement of Paris
Libraries in France
Higher education in France
Contemporary history
Archives in France